Paulo Angelo Valentim (November 20, 1933 – July 9, 1984) was a Brazilian football striker. He played for clubs in Brazil, Argentina and Mexico.

Biography

Valentim came through the youth team of Guarani de Volta Redonda to make his first team debut in 1952. In 1954 he moved to Atlético Mineiro where he helped the team to win three consecutive state championships.

In 1956 he joined Botafogo where he played alongside legendary players like Garrincha, Jairzinho and Nílton Santos. He was called up to play for the Brazil national team and played alongside Pelé in the 1959 South American Championship in Argentina.

In 1960 Valentim moved to Argentina to play for Boca Juniors where he won two championships with the club in 1962 and 1964, being topscorer on both occasions. He was also the clubs topscorer in 1960 and 1961. Valentim is fondly remembered by the Boca Juniors fans for the fact that he scored 10 goals in 7 Superclásico games against their fiercest rivals River Plate. He is still Boca's highest scoring player in games against River Plate.

In 1965 Valentim returned to Brazil to play for São Paulo before joining Atlante F.C. in Mexico and finishing his career with Argentino de Quilmes in the Argentine 2nd division.

Titles

Later years
After retiring from football Valentim stayed in Argentina where he worked as a youth coach. By the 1980s he was living in poverty, he contracted heart problems and hepatitis and died on July 9, 1984 at the age of 50.

External links

Profile at Tardes de Pacaembu 
Profile at Terceiro Tempo 
Boca Juniors profile 

1933 births
1984 deaths
Brazilian footballers
Brazilian expatriate footballers
Brazil international footballers
Association football forwards
Guarani FC players
Clube Atlético Mineiro players
São Paulo FC players
Boca Juniors footballers
Atlante F.C. footballers
Botafogo de Futebol e Regatas players
Argentine Primera División players
Liga MX players
Expatriate footballers in Argentina
Expatriate footballers in Mexico
People from Barra do Piraí